The Tianxingzhou Yangtze River Bridge is a combined road and rail bridge across the Yangtze River in the city of Wuhan, the capital of the Hubei Province of China.

The bridge crosses the Yangtze in the northeastern part of the city, a few kilometers downstream of the  Second Wuhan Yangtze River Bridge. Its name is due to the Tianxing Island (天兴洲, Tianxingzhou), above which it crosses the river. The bridges main span measures , the longest combined road and rail cable-stayed span in the world.

Description
The bridge is a combined road and rail bridge; it has 4 railroad tracks and 6 vehicular traffic lanes. It is the northeastern (downstream) Yangtze crossing for Wuhan's Third Ring Road (the southwestern, upstream, crossing is the Baishazhou Bridge).
 
 there are at least half a dozen of road crossings of the Yangtze River in Wuhan, as well as a subway line under the river. The Tianxingzhou Bridge is only the second railway crossing. It also makes it possible for some of the high-speed trains arriving to Wuhan from the east over the Hefei–Wuhan railway to cross the river and to reach Wuhan railway station (instead of their usual destination, Hankou railway station).

See also
Yangtze River bridges and tunnels
List of largest cable-stayed bridges
List of tallest bridges in the world

References

Bridges completed in 2009
Bridges in Wuhan
Bridges over the Yangtze River
Road-rail bridges in China
Cable-stayed bridges in China
Double-decker bridges